Walt Disney's Babes In Toyland (Disneyland Records ST-3913 / DQ-1219) was the original record album for the 1961 film adaptation.  However, it is a cover version rather than an authentic soundtrack album. The actors in the film are replaced by uncredited singers for this album, but Ann Jillian, from the film's cast, is featured on Never Mind, Bo Peep, and Ed Wynn, also from the film, is featured on the "Workshop Song". Ray Bolger as Barnaby in "We Won't Be Happy Till We Get It" and "Castle in Spain" is replaced by the instantly recognizable Thurl Ravenscroft. A single with Annette's songs was also available.

Tracks 
The tracks listed below are from the Disneyland album:

SIDE ONE
 Mother Goose Village And Lemonade †
 We Won't Be Happy Till We Get It †
 Just A Whisper Away †
 Slowly He Sank To The Bottom Of The Sea •
 Castle In Spain †
 Never Mind Bo-Peep † (Ann Jillian)
 I Can't Do The Sum †

SIDE TWO
 Floretta †
 Forest Of No Return †
 Go To Sleep †
 Toyland †
 Workshop Song † (Ed Wynn)
 Just A Toy †
 March Of The Toys ‡
 Tom And Mary •

• Words & music by Mel Leven & George Bruns

† Words & music by Mel Leven & George Bruns, adapted from the Victor Herbert melodies.

‡ Words & music by George Bruns, adapted from the Victor Herbert melodies.

Original cast album 
An album credited to the "original cast", featuring the performances of the film's cast was also released in 1961, (Buena Vista Records, STER-4022) but this album is not a true soundtrack either. The only items present which could even be loosely attested as being from the original film soundtrack are the re-recorded studio performances of the individual actors' vocals.

As many musicals of the period did, this album featured re-recorded, edited and/or re-arranged versions of songs featured in the film, provided by the same cast which appeared therein.

The choral tracks are instead those heard on the Disneyland Records album, as are the accompanying music tracks to the songs. The album also features a six-minute orchestral overture heard neither in the film nor on the previous album. The main title music as heard in the actual film is not heard on the album.

Therefore, neither album is truly a "soundtrack" recording in that neither contains any session material recorded for the film; the closest is the Buena Vista original cast recording.

Disney film soundtracks
1961 soundtrack albums
Disneyland Records soundtracks
Musical film soundtracks